Sweet Potato Pie is a blues album by Robert Cray. It was released on 5 May 1997, through Mercury Records.  It was recorded by John Hampton and Skidd Mills (who also did the mixing) at Ardent Studios in Memphis, Tennessee.

Track listing 
All tracks composed by Robert Cray; except where indicated
 "Nothing Against You" - 5:46
 "Do That for Me" - 4:26
 "Back Home" - 5:59
 "The One in the Middle" (Jimmy Pugh) - 5:17
 "Little Birds" - 3:50
 "Trick or Treat" (Otis Redding) - 3:10
 "Simple Things" - 4:46
 "Jealous Minds" (Kevin Hayes, Jimmy Pugh) - 4:43
 "Not Bad for Love" - 7:12
 "I Can't Quit" - 5:04

European edition include "Save It" as track #4.

Personnel
Robert Cray - guitar, vocals
Jimmy Pugh - keyboards
Karl Sevareid - bass
Kevin Hayes - drums

References

Robert Cray albums
1997 albums
Mercury Records albums